Gurgel Carajás was a Brazilian car, a SUV, produced by Gurgel between late 1984 and January, 1991. All Carajás were 4 x 2 drive, but they were produced with three engine options: gasoline and ethanol with 1800cc, and diesel with 1600cc. It had a front engine and a rear transmission, connecting both by the use of a system called Tork Tube System, or TTS for short. The late Carajás VIP has four doors on a slightly longer wheelbase, this version uses the same front doors as the ones fitted to the two-door models.

Between 1985 and 1990, it was the number one selling vehicle in its class in Brazil. In 1989, Gurgel Carajás had 75% of market share, against just 25% of its only option in Brazil: the very expensive Toyota Bandeirante. Between 1976 and 1990, importing vehicles was illegal.

This success however was over on the second semester of 1990, when the Lada Niva came to Brazil, and Gurgel Carajás' sales fell. For Gurgel, until 1990, this vehicle was very profitable; on January, 1991, the production was halted.

References

External links
 Carajás Photo and article. 

Carajas
1980s cars
1990s cars